is a passenger railway station located in the city of Nishiwaki, Hyōgo Prefecture, Japan, operated by West Japan Railway Company (JR West).

Lines
Kurodashō Station is served by the Kakogawa Line and is 38.5 kilometers from the terminus of the line at

Station layout
The station consists of one ground-level side platform serving bi-directional track. The station is unattended. The station formerly had two opposed side platforms, but one of these platforms is not in use.

History
Kurodashō Station opened on 27 December 1924. With the privatization of the Japan National Railways (JNR) on 1 April 1987, the station came under the aegis of the West Japan Railway Company. The current station building was completed in 2005.

Passenger statistics
In fiscal 2019, the station was used by an average of 32 passengers daily

Surrounding area
 Kurodashō Fire Department
Gokurakuji Temple
Kusugaoka Elementary School

See also
List of railway stations in Japan

References

External links

  

Railway stations in Hyōgo Prefecture
Railway stations in Japan opened in 1924
Nishiwaki, Hyōgo